Amphibolips quercusracemaria is a species of gall wasp in the family Cynipidae.

References 

Cynipidae
Insects described in 1881
Gall-inducing insects
Oak galls